Sture Terminal is an oil terminal at Stura in Øygarden municipality,  northwest of Bergen, Norway. It receives oil and condensate (light oil) from Oseberg, Veslefrikk, Brage, Oseberg Sør, Oseberg Øst, Tune and Huldra fields through  Oseberg Transport System (OTS) and oil from Grane oil field through  Grane oil pipeline.

History
The Sture terminal began its operations on 1 December 1988. On 30 November 1988 the first oil from the Oseberg field reached the Sture terminal. It had travelled by 115 kilometer pipeline for 4 days at depths as low as 360 meters with a speed of 1 km/h. The terminal celebrated its 20-year anniversary in 2008 The Norwegian Ministry of Petroleum and Energy approved an upgrade to the facility in March 1998. As per the upgrade, a fractionation plant would process unstabilized crude oil from Oseberg into stabilized oil and an LPG blend. The plant became operational in December 1999 and LPG blend produced in the plant is exported by ship or delivered through the Vestprosess pipeline between Kollsnes, Stura, Mongstad.

Ownership
The Sture terminal has the same ownership shares as in Oseberg Transport System (OTS):

The exception is the LPG export facilities which are a property of Norsk Hydro (the refrigerated LPG storage and transfer system to ships) and Vestprosess DA (export facility to Vestprosess).

Technical features
The terminal has two jetties which allows to load up to 300,000 tonnes onto oil tankers. It also has five rock caverns for crude oil storage with a total capacity of 6.3 million barrels. Additionally, there is a 60,000 m3 rock cavern for storage of LPG and a 200,000 m3 ballast water cavern in the terminal. Separate unit for recovering of volatile organic compounds (VOC), environmentally important during loading of tankers is also in operation. Nearly 250-260 crude oil and LPG carriers go through Sture terminal each year

Production
Nearly 25% of Norway's oil production passes through Sture terminal. In 2009, after StatoilHydro shut down six oil and gas fields along with the Sture terminal, the Norwegian Petroleum Directorate had the following production 2009 expectations for fields exporting oil through Sture terminal:

See also

Oseberg Transport System
North Sea oil
Economy of Norway
Oseberg oil field
Grane oil field

References

External links
Statoil official website
Hydro official website

Oil terminals
Petroleum industry in Norway
North Sea energy
Equinor
Industrial parks in Norway
Ports and harbours of Norway
Energy infrastructure in Norway
1988 establishments in Norway